Graham Richard Lea (March 6, 1934 – April 3, 2013) was a broadcaster, politician and corporate leader in British Columbia. He represented Prince Rupert in the Legislative Assembly of British Columbia from 1972 to 1986 as a New Democratic Party (NDP), then United Party and finally Progressive Conservative member.

He was born in Nakusp, British Columbia, the son of George Lea and Beatrice Ellen Graham. Lea served in the Royal Canadian Air Force from 1951 to 1954 and as a CBC broadcaster in Whitehorse, Vancouver and Prince Rupert. First married to Elaine, who he had three children with, then another son with Sharon Clifford, following he was married to Rozlynne Mitchell for many years until his death on April 3, 2013. Lea had four children - Melanie, Marni, Alex, David and nine grandchildren. Lea served in the provincial cabinet as Minister of Highways in the Barrett government and as opposition critic for a number of economic portfolios . After an unsuccessful bid for the leadership of the NDP in 1984, he sat as an independent. Lea then sat as a member of the short-lived United Party of British Columbia. In 1986, he became a Progressive Conservative party member. Lea did not run for reelection in 1986. Following his political career Lea served as Executive Director of the Truck Loggers Association for 11 years. During his political and corporate tenure Lea was a strong voice in provincial economic and resource related policies.

Lea died on April 3, 2013 at Victoria.

References 

1934 births
2013 deaths
British Columbia Conservative Party MLAs
British Columbia New Democratic Party MLAs
Canadian Broadcasting Corporation people
Mechanics (people)
Members of the Executive Council of British Columbia
Royal Canadian Air Force officers